Samuel Moyer (c. 1609–1683) was an English merchant and politician who sat in the House of Commons  in  1653. He was a strong republican and supporter of the Parliamentary cause in the English Civil War.

Biography
Moyer was a merchant in the City of London and a member of the Worshipful Company of Mercers. He was a strong supporter of parliament and the Commonwealth. In 1652 he was a member of Hale Commission which made a fundamental examination of the law and introduced many aspects of the criminal justice system.

Moyer was one of a number of radical puritans who had a house in Clapham Surrey, in his case from 1652 to 1662. A number of his associates such as Richard Salwey and William Kiffin were there at the same time.

In 1653, Moyer became an Alderman of the City of London for Cheap ward and was then nominated as Member of Parliament for City of London in the Barebones Parliament. In the same year he was Master of the Mercer's Company. He was acting president of the Council of State from 4 October 1653 to 3 November 1653. He was by 1659 chairman of the London Committee for Compounding.  On 15 February 1659, he presented a petition to the House of Commons on behalf of the Commonwealth.

In 1661 Moyer was arrested and charged with treason alongside James Harrington and Praise-God Barebone. He was then imprisoned in the Tower of London until his brother Laurence secured his release in 1667.

Family
Moyer was the father of Samuel Moyer who was also a merchant and was created a baronet in 1701 (see Moyer Baronets).

References

1609 births
1683 deaths
Members of the Parliament of England for the City of London
Year of birth uncertain
English merchants
People from the City of London
Roundheads
Prisoners in the Tower of London
English MPs 1653 (Barebones)